Gumboot Lake is a lake in Thunder Bay District, Ontario, Canada. The primary inflow and outflow is the Whitesand River, which flows downstream to Longcanoe Lake.

References

Lakes of Thunder Bay District